Anne Oskarsson (born 1946) is a Swedish politician for the Sweden Democrats party and a member of the Riksdag since 2018.

Oskarsson graduated with a Master's degree in scientific engineering and worked as a civil engineer, making her one of five Sweden Democrats MPs to come from an engineering background to be elected to parliament in 2018. Oskarsson is a municipal councilor in Borgholm and serves as the SD group leader in Borgholm. She currently represents the constituency of Kalmar County and takes seat 60 in the Riksdag.

References 

Swedish engineers
Members of the Riksdag from the Sweden Democrats
1946 births
Living people
Lund University alumni
Members of the Riksdag 2018–2022
21st-century Swedish politicians